William Yonge (20 June 1753 – 2 December 1845) was Archdeacon of Norwich  from 1868 until his death

Yonge was born in Great Torrington and was educated at Jesus College, Cambridge and ordained in 1777. He held livings at Hilborough, Swaffham, Necton and Holme Hale. He died in Swaffham, aged 92.

References

1753 births
1845 deaths
18th-century English Anglican priests
19th-century English Anglican priests
People from Great Torrington
Archdeacons of Norwich
Alumni of Jesus College, Cambridge
Clergy from Devon
People from Swaffham